Hansan Mosi, a fine Ramie (Mosi in Korean) weaved clothes made in Hansan area of Seocheon County in South Chungcheong Province, is one of Korean traditional textiles. Hansan mosi - its weaving to be specific - is inscribed in UNESCO Intangible Cultural Heritage List from 2011 and enlisted as South Korean Intangible Cultural Property from 1967. Due to its light weight, it was mostly worn in summer time.

See also 

 UNESCO's page for Hansan Mosi

References 

Intangible Cultural Heritage of Humanity
Korean traditions
Korean culture
Important Intangible Cultural Properties of South Korea
Seocheon County